The Dominican Republic competed at the 2011 Pan American Games in Guadalajara, Mexico from October 14 to 30, 2011. Gabriel Mercedes a taekwondo athlete was selected to carry the flag during the opening ceremony.

Medalists

Archery

The Dominican Republic has qualified one female athlete in the archery competition.

Women

Athletics

Men

Track and road events

Women

Track and road events

Field events

Combined events

Badminton

The Dominican Republic has qualified two male and female athletes in the individual and team badminton competitions.

Men

Women

Mixed

Baseball

The Dominican Republic has qualified a baseball team of twenty athletes to participate.

Team

Mario Alvarez Ysabel
Jose Campusano Solano
Silvio Castillo
Bernabet Castro Moronta
Dionis Cesar Alvarez
Rafael Cruz Baez
Francisco Cruceta
Cristopher De La Cruz
Logan Duran
Bartolomé Fortunato
Alexis Gómez
Angel Gonzalez
Francisco Hernandez
Runelvys Hernandez
Henry Mateo
Victor Mendez Aquino
Jacobo Meque
Arnaldo Munos
Roberto Novoa
Willis Otáñez
Juan Antonio Pena
Juan Miguel Richardson
Danilo Sanchez Lopez
Darío Veras

Standings

Results

Fifth place match

Basketball

Men

Team

Juan Coronado
Elpidio Fortuna
Elys Guzman Garcia
Luis Guzmán
Victor Liz
Luis Martinez
Jack Michael Martínez
Cristian Montas
Juan Pablo Montas
Kelvin Peña
Edward Santana
Ricardo Soliver

Standings

Results

Semifinals

Bronze-medal match

Beach volleyball

The Dominican Republic has qualified a men's team in the beach volleyball competition.

Men

Bowling

The Dominican Republic has qualified two male and two female athletes in the individual and team bowling competitions.

Men
Individual

Pairs

Women
Individual

Pairs

Boxing
 
The Dominican Republic has qualified seven athletes in the 49 kg, 52 kg, 56 kg, 64 kg, 69 kg, 81 kg, and 91 kg men's categories and one athlete in the 75 kg women's category.

Men

Women

Cycling

Road Cycling

Men

Track cycling

Diving

Men

Equestrian

Dressage

Individual jumping

Fencing

The Dominican Republic has qualified one athlete each in the women's individual épee and foil competitions, and one pair of athletes in the women's individual and team sabre competitions.

Women

Gymnastics

Artistic
The Dominican Republic has qualified one male and one female athlete in the artistic gymnastics competition.

Men

Individual qualification & Team Finals

Women
Individual qualification & Team Finals

Individual Finals

Handball

Men

Team

Julio Almeida
Franalbert Aybar
Michael Bravet
Domingo Caraballo
Kelvin de León
Leony de León
Geraldo Díaz
Elvin Fis
Pablo Jacobo
Dioris Mateo
Carlos Miraval
Luis Sanlate
Juan Tapia
Erinson Tavares
Luis Taveras

Standings

Results

Semifinals

Bronze medal match

Women

Team

Mariela Andino
Mariela Cespedes
Mari Colón
Cari Dominguez
Mileidys García
Judith Granado
Crisleydi Hernández
Carolina López
Indiana Mateo
Nancy Peña
Johanna Pimentel
Jessica Sierra
Suleidy Suárez
Yacaira Tejada
Devora Torreira

Standings

Results

Semifinals

Bronze medal match

Karate

The Dominican Republic has qualified four athletes in the 60 kg, 67 kg, 75 kg, and 84 kg men's categories and four athletes in the 50 kg, 55 kg, 61 kg and 68 kg women's categories.

Men

Women

Modern pentathlon

The Dominican Republic has qualified two male pentathletes.

Men

Racquetball

The Dominican Republic has qualified two male and two female athletes in the racquetball competition.

Men

Women

Sailing

The Dominican Republic has qualified one boat and one athlete in the sailing competition.

Men

Shooting

Men

Women

Softball

The Dominican Republic has qualified a team to participate. The team consisted of 17 athletes.

Team

Kenia Benzant Perez
Vitalia De La Rosa
Dharianna Famlia Furcal
Geraldina Feliz Urbaez
Altagracia Garcia
Josefina Mercedes Henriguez
Geovanny Nunez Garcia
Hanna Penna
Erika Perez Cuello
Rosaury Perez Cuevas
Maribel Pie Contreras
Danelis Ramirez
Eduarda Roche
Rosangela Rodriguez Morales
Lidizeth Soto Ramirez
Aureliza Tejada Aquino
Ana Ulloa

Standings

Results

Swimming

Men

Women

Table tennis

The Dominican Republic has qualified three male and three female athletes in the table tennis competition.

Men

Women

Taekwondo

The Dominican Republic has qualified seven athletes (three male and four female).

Men

Women

Tennis

Men

Volleyball

Women

Team

Candida Arias
Ana Yorkira Binet
Dahiana Burgos
Milagros Cabral
Brenda Castillo
Bethania de la Cruz
Karla Echenique
Lisvel Elisa Eve
Niverka Marte
Sidarka Núñez
Prisilla Rivera
Cindy Rondon

Standings

Results

Quarterfinals

Semifinals

Bronze medal match

Weightlifting

Wrestling

The Dominican Republic has qualified three athletes in the 55 kg, 60 kg, and 120 kg men's freestyle categories, six athletes in the 55 kg, 60 kg, 66 kg, 74 kg, 84 kg, and 120 kg men's Greco-Roman categories, and two athletes in the 63 kg and 72 kg women's freestyle athletes.

Men
Freestyle

Greco-Roman

Women
Freestyle

References

Nations at the 2011 Pan American Games
P
2011